Mike Hax (born 29 May 1970) is a German judoka.

Achievements

References

1970 births
Living people
German male judoka
Place of birth missing (living people)
20th-century German people
21st-century German people